|}

The International Stakes is a Group 1 flat horse race in Great Britain open to horses aged three years or older. It is run at York over a distance of 1 mile, 2 furlongs and 56 yards (2,063 metres), and it is scheduled to take place each year in August.

History
The event was devised by Major Leslie Petch, a former Clerk of the Course at York. It was first run in 1972, but by this time Petch had resigned from his position due to ill health. The race was originally sponsored by Benson and Hedges and called the Benson and Hedges Gold Cup. The inaugural running was won by Roberto, that year's Derby winner. The second-placed horse was Brigadier Gerard – his only defeat in a career of eighteen races.

The sponsorship of Benson and Hedges continued until 1985, and for the following two years the event was backed by the bloodstock company Matchmaker. Its title during this period was the Matchmaker International. The present sponsor, Juddmonte Farms, started supporting the race in 1989. It is now familiarly known as the Juddmonte International.

The International Stakes is currently held on the opening day of York's four-day Ebor Festival meeting. It is the venue's richest race of the season.

Records
Most successful horse (2 wins):
 Dahlia – 1974, 1975
 Ezzoud – 1993, 1994
 Halling – 1995, 1996

Leading jockey (5 wins):
 Lester Piggott – Dahlia (1974, 1975), Hawaiian Sound (1978), Commanche Run (1985), Rodrigo de Triano (1992)
 Frankie Dettori – Halling (1996), Singspiel (1997), Sakhee (2001), Sulamani (2004), Authorized (2007)

Leading trainer (6 wins):
 Sir Michael Stoute – Shardari (1986), Ezzoud (1993, 1994), Singspiel (1997), Notnowcato (2006), Ulysses (2017)
 Aidan O'Brien - Giant's Causeway (2000), Duke of Marmalade (2008), Rip van Winkle (2010), Declaration of War (2013), Australia (2014), Japan (2019)

Leading owner (6 wins): (includes part ownership)

 Susan Magnier - Giant's Causeway (2000), Duke of Marmalade (2008), Rip van Winkle (2010), Declaration of War (2013), Australia (2014), Japan (2019)
 Michael Tabor - Giant's Causeway (2000), Duke of Marmalade (2008), Rip van Winkle (2010), Declaration of War (2013), Australia (2014), Japan (2019)

Winners

See also
 Horse racing in Great Britain
 List of British flat horse races
 Recurring sporting events established in 1972  – this race is included under its original title, Benson and Hedges Gold Cup.

References
 Paris-Turf: 
 Racing Post:

 galopp-sieger.de – International Stakes (ex Benson & Hedges Gold Cup).
 ifhaonline.org – International Federation of Horseracing Authorities – International Stakes (2019).
 pedigreequery.com – International Stakes – York.
 
 YouTube Race Video https://www.youtube.com/playlist?list=PLfn5x2SD03q6AhRh0wAtGQlzcYiVgSM5i

External links
York Racecourse Ebor festival page
The Ebor Festival website
The Ebor Festival dates and full schedule

Flat races in Great Britain
York Racecourse
Open middle distance horse races
British Champions Series
Breeders' Cup Challenge series
1972 establishments in England